Typha domingensis, known commonly as southern cattail or cumbungi, is a perennial herbaceous plant of the genus Typha.

Distribution and habitat
It is found throughout temperate and tropical regions worldwide. It is sometimes found as a subdominant associate in mangrove ecosystems such as the Petenes mangroves ecoregion of Yucatán.

Uses
In the Mesopotamian Marshes of southern Iraq, Khirret is a dessert made from the pollen of this plant. In Turkish folk medicine the female inflorescences of this plant and other Typha are used externally to treat wounds such as burns. Extracts of T. domingensis have been demonstrated to have wound healing properties in rat models.

Water extracts of the fruit, female flower and male flower of Typha domingensis exhibit iron chelating activity as well as superoxide and nitric oxide scavenging activities. By contrast, only the fruit and female flower extracts were found to have alpha-glucosidase inhibitory activity. A partially purified, proanthocyanidin-rich butanol fraction of the fruit was shown to be a competitive inhibitor of alpha-glucosidase, which also had concurrent antioxidant activity.

Recently it was found that Typha domingensis is very effective at reducing bacterial contamination of water for agricultural use. This plant helps to reduce, up to 98 percent, pollution by enterobacteria (usually found in the intestines of mammals) involved in the development of disease.

Usage in Mexico

The Southern Cattail grows between 2.0 to 2.5 meters in length and has flat sheaths to protect its core. It thrives in marshes and ecosystems where the land has a similarity to wetlands. It can also survive in high salinity water sources, making it much more resilient than similar species to this kind of cattail. The Southern Cattail originated in the Southern United States, and transitioned its way to other ecosystems from Iran to Mexico through human intervention. In Mexico, this invasive species has proven to be beneficial to local ecosystems rather than a nuisance to it. Aside from being a filter for some of the water’s quality, the surrounding villages that dwell within the circumference of the lake benefit from both the Southern Cattail and its similar species, the Southern Bulrush, by its ability to be used in artisanal crafts and due to their wider reed sheaths which eased the weaving process.
Areas where the cattail is harvested in much larger methods, such as the coastal areas of San Jeronimo and Tzintzuntzan, seem to exhibit larger than average cattail sizes, lengths, and population density. It's within these areas that at times, the amount of reproducing cattail can prove to be too much as it overruns some farm land, so its planned from the surrounding villagers to be routinely harvested and cut down to a reasonable size monthly or whenever the population rises to an overrunning size. This is especially common during the months of August and September, the rainiest months that the surrounding villages seem to experience during the last months of Summer.
	With such a large density, this also proves to be beneficial to the surrounding organisms which live near the lake such as the Lake Patzcuaro Garter Snake, which thrives near the cattail closest to the lake. Creating a thick shade for the snakes, they also make this an area to not only reproduce but also protect their young which can protect against other predators which surround the lake such as the hawk species such as the Red-Tailed Hawk and occasional larger snake species which also thrives within the lake.
	With all these benefits that it gives to the ecosystem, the largest benefit this species has provided was the reduction of the water’s pollution from external sources. When some water containing animal fecal matter was placed in the same water as the cattail species in an experiment done within the Helmholtz center in Germany with support from the National Council of Science and Technology in Mexico, it was discovered to have filtered around 98% of the bacteria found within the water. This discovery showed that this invasive species had the potential to reduce the biological impact these bacteria could have not only on the surrounding animals, but also surrounding humans which have used the lake as their main source of water for generations.

References

External links

Flora of North America

domingensis
Flora of North America
Flora of Australia
Flora of Africa
Flora of Europe
Flora of temperate Asia
Flora of tropical Asia
Aquatic plants
Plants described in 1807
Medicinal plants